"Bettadaze" is a song by Australian band, Boom Crash Opera. The song was released in November 1992 as the lead single from their third studio album, Fabulous Beast (1993).

Track listing
 "Bettadaze"	- 3:51
 "The Last Place on Earth" - 3:21
 "L.A. 4am" - 2:42

Charts

References

External links 
Boom Crash Opera website

1992 songs
1992 singles
Boom Crash Opera songs